The Foundation for Interreligious and Intercultural Research and Dialogue (FIIRD) is a registered charitable organization in Alberta, Canada. 

It was founded in 1999, and sponsored by the Levant Foundation with the University of Geneva in Switzerland. The main program of the FIIRD is to enhance knowledge and the critical examination of the wellsprings of each religious tradition and then to acquire the linguistic and strategic tools needed to study the normative scriptures of these religions without syncretism or proselytism.

Board of Trustees 
The Board of Trustees has included notable religious and political men, such as:   
 Prince El Hassan bin Talal, of the Hashemite Kingdom of Jordan
Cardinal Joseph Ratzinger (the future Pope Benedict XVI)
 Archbishop Michael L. Fitzgerald, Apostolic Nuncio in Egypt (who replaced Foundation co-founder and Trustee Joseph Cardinal Ratzinger, later Pope Benedict XVI)
 Chief Rabbi Rene-Samuel Sirat, former Chief Rabbi of France
 Sayyed Jawad Al-Khoei, Imam Al-Khoei Benevolent Foundation
 Emmanuel Adamakis, Metropolitan of France, Liaison Office of the Orthodox Church to the European Union
 Maitre Michel Halperin, Lawyer, Member of the Grand Conseil de la Republique et Canton de Geneve and its President in 2006
Neil Bush, son of former President George H. W. Bush
 Professor Damaskinos Papandreou, former Metropolitan of Switzerland and Director of the Orthodox Center of the Ecumenical Patriarchate (Chambes/Geneva)
 Jamal Daniel, also FIIRD co-founder, current Vice President, and Trustee.

List of FIIRD Fellows 
 Vito Evola
 Leila El Bachiri
 Naël Georges
 Guila-Clara Kessous
 Stefano Bigliardi
 Omar Fassatoui
 Daniel Moulin-Stozek
 Ionut Untea

Projects and Goals
In 2006 the FIIRD has published a boxed set of three holy books: the Hebrew Bible, the New Testament, and the Holy Qur'an.

Another goal of the FIIRD, supported by the Levant Foundation, was to create a post-doctoral program at the University of Geneva in the field of interreligious and intercultural dialogue whereby several Fellows, each possessing a Ph.D. in multiple subjects, and those who are dedicated to further their knowledge and understanding of the monotheistic religions, participate in approved research and publish their results all done with the goal of searching for peace between the Abrahamic religions of Judaism, Christianity, and Islam.

External links 
 "Prince Hassan launches new foundation for inter-religious, inter-cultural research", Jordan Times, Tuesday, May 4, 1999
 Prince El Hassan's webpage for the Foundation for Intercultural and Interfaith Research and Dialogue
 The Levant Foundations page for the FIIRD
 Pope Benedict XVI's address to the Foundation for Interreligious and Intercultural Research and Dialogue, 1 February 2007
 FIIRD Academic Fellows announced for 2011/2012

References 

Interfaith organizations
Religious studies
Interculturalism